is the debut EP by the Japanese girl band Princess Princess. Released on May 21, 1986 on EP and cassette and June 21, 1986 on CD, by CBS Sony, the EP was produced by Tohru Okada of the rock band Moonriders, and features songs written by Gorō Matsui, Hideya Nakazaki, Kenzō Saeki, Masaya Matsuura, and Keiko Asō. "Tokyo Kanojo" was the first song written by the band.

The EP peaked at No. 48 and the cassette version reached No. 76 on Oricon's albums chart.

Track listing

Charts

References

External links
 
 
 

Princess Princess (band) albums
1986 debut EPs
Sony Music Entertainment Japan EPs
Japanese-language EPs